= Dimitrios Paraskevas =

Greek-American basketball player

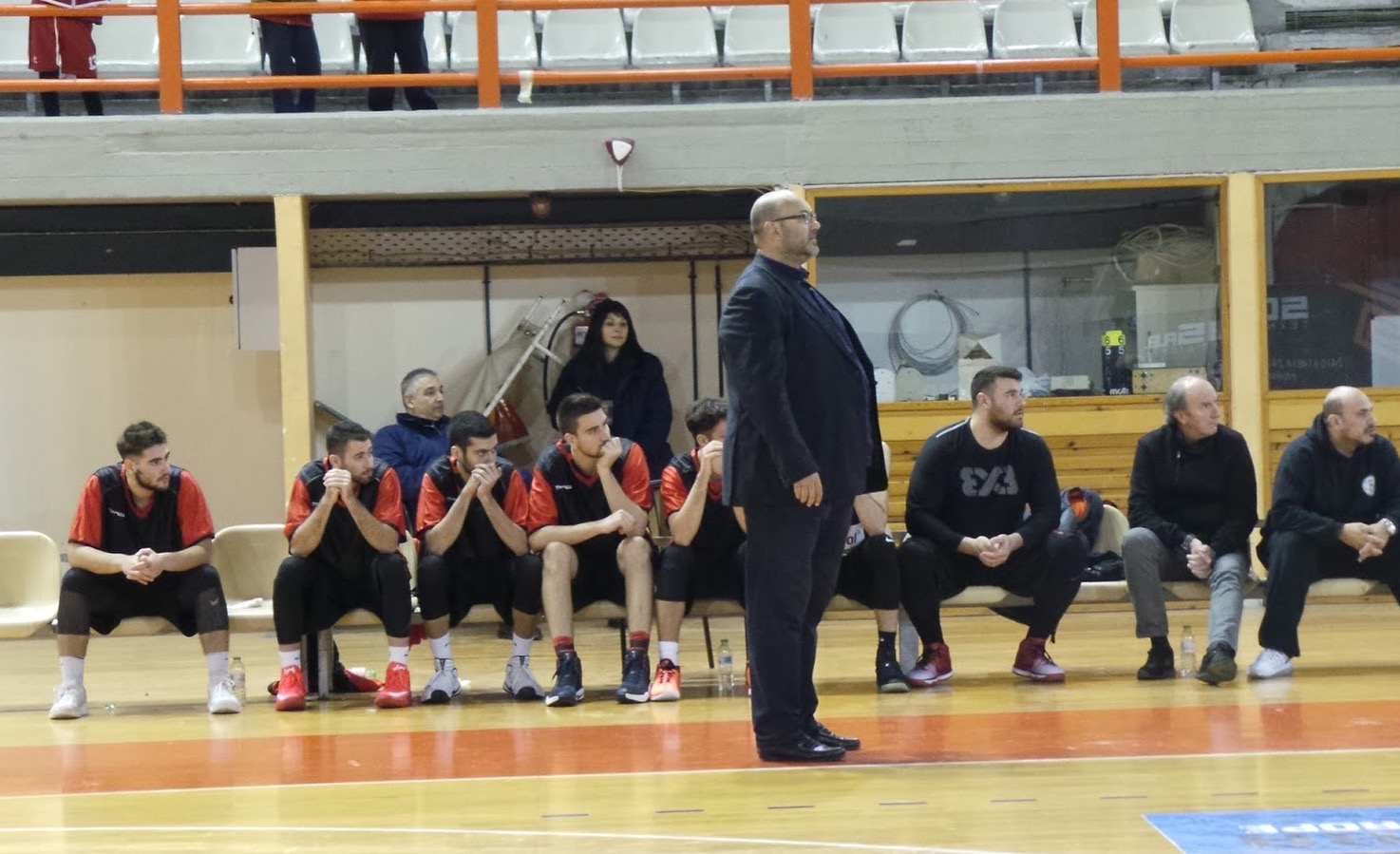
- Paraskevas with Pagrati

Personal information
- Born: October 4, 1995 (age 31) New Jersey, U.S.
- Listed height: 6 ft 2 in (1.88 m)

Dimitrios Paraskevas (born October 4, 1995) is an American professional basketball player of Greek descent.
